Palaindoor di Ancona is an indoor arena in Ancona, Italy. The arena holds 2,069 spectators. It is primarily used for indoor athletics. It is located in Palombare.

Events
Thirteen editions of the championships were held in this indoor arena, uninterruptedly Italian Athletics Indoor Championships from 2010 to 2020 with the exception of the editions 2008, 2009 and 2015 that was held in Padua.

See also
List of indoor arenas in Italy

References

External links
 Venue homepage

Indoor arenas in Italy
Indoor track and field venues
Sports venues completed in 2005